Marker of the Swans, or Swan Marker, is an office in the Royal Household of the Sovereign of the United Kingdom.

History 
The role dates back to the twelfth century and through the years its title has changed from Master, Keeper, and in 1993, to Swan Marker.  The new post of Swan Warden was also created at this time.

Role of The King's Swan Marker 
The King's Swan Marker still organises the annual event of Swan Upping on the River Thames.

Apart from Swan Upping, The King's Swan Marker has other duties.  He advises organisations throughout the country about swan welfare and incidents involving swans, he monitors the health of the local swan population and advises fishing and boating organisations how to work with wildlife.  The King's Swan Marker works closely with swan rescue organisations and supervises the rescue of sick and injured swans.  He also co-ordinates the removal of swans from stretches of the River Thames used for summer rowing regattas.

Holders 
The current office-holder is David Barber, MVO, appointed in 1993. Barber is a boat engine merchant by occupation.

See also 
 Swan mark

References 

Ceremonial officers in the United Kingdom
Culture associated with the River Thames
Positions within the British Royal Household
Swans